is a railway station on the JR West Osaka Loop Line, Hanwa Line, Yamatoji Line, Osaka Metro Midōsuji Line, and Tanimachi Line, located in Tennōji-ku and Abeno-ku, Osaka, Japan, and  is a railway station on the tram Hankai Uemachi Line in Abeno-ku, Osaka, Japan.  They are also connected to Ōsaka Abenobashi Station on the Kintetsu Minami Osaka Line. It forms as one of Osaka's main railway terminals to the south for lines operated by West Japan Railway Company (JR West).

Lines
Tennōji Station
West Japan Railway Company (JR West)
Kansai Main Line (Yamatoji Line)
Osaka Loop Line
Hanwa Line
Osaka Metro
 (M23)
 (T27)
Tennōji-eki-mae Station
Hankai Uemachi Line
Connecting station
Ōsaka Abenobashi Station (F01)
Kintetsu Minami Osaka Line

JR West Tennōji Station

Layout
Hanwa Line - 5 bay platforms serving 5 tracks on the ground.

Osaka Loop Line - 2 island platforms serving 3 tracks on the lower level than the Hanwa Line

Yamatoji Line - 2 island platforms serving 4 tracks on the lower level than the Hanwa Line

Train services in off-peak hours
Yamatoji Line
eastbound trains
4 Yamatoji rapid services from the Osaka Loop Line to Nara  (every 15 minutes), of which 2 continue to Kamo (every 30 minutes)
4 local trains from JR Namba to Oji (every 15 minutes)
westbound trains
4 local trains to JR Namba (every 15 minutes)
Osaka Loop Line
counterclockwise trains
12 trains to Osaka via Kyobashi (every 5 minutes)
clockwise trains
4 Yamatoji rapid services to Osaka via Nishikujo (every 15 minutes)
4 Airport/Kishuji rapid services to Osaka via Nishikujo (every 15 minutes)
4 local trains to Osaka via Nishikujo (every 15 minutes)
Hanwa Line
southbound trains
4 Airport rapid services to Kansai Airport, coupling with Kishuji rapid services until Hineno
4 Kishuji rapid services to Wakayama, coupling with Airport rapid services until Hineno
4 regional rapid services to Hineno
4 local trains to Otori

Adjacent stations

History 
Station numbering was introduced to the JR West facilities March 2018 with the Yamatoji Line being assigned station number JR-Q20, the Osaka Loop line being assigned station number JR-O01, and the Hanwa Line being assigned station number JR-R20.

Osaka Metro station

Osaka Metro Tennōji Station is an interchange serving the Midōsuji and Tanimachi lines. The platforms are not adjacent to each other, but are connected by a long passageway within the ticket gates.

Layout
Midosuji Line
The station has a side platform and an island platform serving three tracks on the second basement. They have automatic platform gates.

Tanimachi Line
The station has two side platforms with two tracks on the third basement, under the ticket gates and concourse under the underground city "Avetika".

Train services in off-peak hours
Midosuji Line (weekdays)
northbound trains
6 or 7 trains from Nakamozu to Senri-chuo (every 8 minutes)
6 or 7 trains starting from Tennoji to Shin-Osaka (every 8 minutes)
southbound trains
6 or 7 trains to Nakamozu (every 8 minutes)
Midosuji Line (weekends and holidays)
northbound trains
8 trains from Nakamozu to Senri-chuo (every 7.5 minutes)
8 trains starting from Tennoji to Shin-Osaka (every 7.5 minutes)
southbound trains
8 trains to Nakamozu (every 7.5 minutes)
Tanimachi Line
northbound trains
10 trains to Dainichi (every 6 minutes)
southbound trains
10 trains to Yao-minami (every 6 minutes)

Hankai Tramway Tennoji-ekimae Station

Layout
2 dead-end platforms serving a track are located on Abenosuji Avenue. After widening the avenue and relocated westward on December 3, 2016, the tram stop is connected from JR West Tennoji Station and Kintetsu Railway Osaka Abenobashi Station via Abeno Pedestrian Bridge and from Osaka Metro Tennoji Station via the underground passage. After the relocation, an elevator became in use to enable wheelchairs and baby buggies to access to the Uemachi Line.

Tram services in off-peak hours
10 trams to Abikomichi via Sumiyoshi-Toriimae, of which 5 continues to Hamadera-ekimae (every 6 minutes)

Adjacent stations

|-
!colspan=5|Hankai Tramway (HN01)

Surrounding area
Since so many train lines meet in one location, Tennōji has become a large transfer station. As a result, the area around the station has become quite built up with may buildings as high as 10 or 12 stories high.

Tennōji Park
Tennōji Zoo
Osaka Municipal Museum of Art
Tennoji MiO (shopping mall)
Main Building
Plaza Annex
Abeno Harukas
Kintetsu Department Store Main Store Abeno Harukas
Harukas 300
Abeno Harukas Art Museum
Osaka Mariott Miyako Hotel
Tennōji Miyako Hotel
Hoop
and
Avetika (underground city)
Abeno Cues Town (shopping mall)
Shitennō-ji
Isshin-ji
Osaka City University Hospital

Buses
Transit bus
Osaka City Bus Corporation (Abenobashi, Abenobashi-nishi)
Kintetsu Bus Co., Ltd. (Abenobashi, Abenobashi-higashiguchi)
Expressway bus
Kintetsu Bus Co., Ltd. (Abenobashi Bus Station)
West JR Bus Company, JR Bus Kanto Co., Ltd., Osaka Bus Co., Ltd. (Tennoji Station, the east side of Tennoji Park)
Airport limousine
Osaka Airport Transport Co., Ltd. (the north side of Apollo Building)
Kintetsu Bus Co., Ltd., Kansai Airport Transportation Enterprise Co., Ltd. (the north side of Osaka Abenobashi Station)

For details, see Osaka Abenobashi Station#Bus stops

See also
 List of railway stations in Japan

External links

 [https://subway.osakametro.co.jp/station_guide/M/m23/index.php Official Site - Midōsuji Line 
 Official Site - Midōsuji Line 
 Official Site - Tanimachi Line 
 Official Site - Tanimachi Line

References

Abeno-ku, Osaka
Railway stations in Japan opened in 1900
Railway stations in Japan opened in 1938
Railway stations in Japan opened in 1889
Railway stations in Osaka
Osaka Metro stations